Software Automatic Mouth, or S.A.M. (sometimes abbreviated as SAM), is a speech synthesis program developed by Mark Barton and sold by Don't Ask Software. The program was released for the Atari 8-bit family, Apple II, and Commodore 64. Released in 1982, it was one of the first commercial all-software voice-synthesis programs.

Don't Ask Software also sold PokerSAM, a poker game with speech, and also licensed out the S.A.M. engine for use with other games, such as Tales of the Arabian Nights for the Commodore 64.

Technology
The Apple version uses an included expansion card which contains an 8-bit DAC, although pirates created a modified version of S.A.M. which can instead use the computer's one-bit audio output (with the addition of much distortion) if the card is not present. The Atari version makes use of the embedded POKEY audio chip. Speech playback on the Atari normally disables interrupt requests and shuts down the ANTIC chip during vocal output. The audible output is extremely distorted speech when graphic and text display is turned on. The Commodore 64 makes use of the 64's embedded SID audio chip's 4-bit volume DAC, reducing its quality significantly vs the Apple and Atari versions.

Legacy
S.A.M. was used as the basis for the original MacInTalk speech synthesis software.

The technology was recreated for the voice of the character of "SAM" in the software Chipspeech.

S.A.M. was used to create the voices of characters in the 2017 game Faith: The Unholy Trinity.

References

External links
 Speech Synthesizers for Atari and Apple magazine review
 Spelling.SAM an Atari BASIC spelling program
 SAM manual reproduction of the Atari version manual
 Analysis of SAM translated version to C and executable for Windows
 Run SAM in the Browser translated version to native JavaScript
  SAM as JAVA class file for the JVM
 2020 Interview with Mark Barton about S.A.M.

1982 software
Apple II software
Atari 8-bit family software
Commodore 64 software
Speech synthesis software